The chief justice of New Zealand is the head of the New Zealand judiciary, and presides over the Supreme Court of New Zealand. The chief justice of New Zealand is also the chief justice of Tokelau. Before the establishment of the Supreme Court in 2004, the chief justice was the presiding judge in the High Court of New Zealand, and was also ex officio a member of the Court of Appeal of New Zealand. The office is established by the Senior Courts Act 2016, which describes the chief justice as "senior to all other judges".

The chief justice is first among equals among the Judges of the Supreme Court. They also act in place of the governor-general if one has not been appointed or if the appointee is unable to perform their duties. When acting in place of the governor-general, the chief justice is known as the "administrator of the Government".

The chief justice is appointed by the governor-general, on the formal advice of the prime minister. The current chief justice is the Rt Hon Dame Helen Winkelmann, who was appointed on 14 March 2019 to replace the Rt Hon Dame Sian Elias, who had reached mandatory retirement at age 70.

History

From 1841 to 1957, the chief justice was the indisputable senior member of the New Zealand judiciary, and served on the old Supreme Court (now called the High Court of New Zealand). Prior to 1957, all judges of the Supreme Court sat as members of the Court of Appeal. In 1957, a permanent Court of Appeal was established which was headed by a President responsible for the running of that court. The role of the chief justice became akin to that of the current chief High Court judge, responsible for the operation of the High Court (comprising the largest part of the senior judiciary) but not having control over the senior New Zealand–based appellate court (being the Court of Appeal).

This changed in 2004 with the abolition of the right of appeal to the Judicial Committee of the Privy Council and its replacement by the Supreme Court of New Zealand as the court of last resort for New Zealand. When the new Supreme Court was established, the chief justice became head of that court.

List of chief justices

References

External links
 Ministry of Justice - The Chief Justice
 Administrators of the Government

New Zealand
Law of New Zealand
 
1841 establishments in New Zealand